The initial design and planning of Windows 95 can be traced back to around March 1992, just after the release of Windows 3.1. At this time, Windows for Workgroups 3.11 and Windows NT 3.1 were still in development. At this point, Microsoft's strategy was to have a next generation, high-end OS based on Windows NT, namely, Cairo, and a low-end, consumer-focused one as an evolution of Windows 3.1. The latter strategy was to develop a 32-bit underlying kernel and filesystem with 32-bit protect mode device drivers in Windows for Workgroups 3.11, to be used as the basis for the next version of Windows, code named "Chicago." Cairo would be Microsoft's next-generation operating system based on Windows NT featuring a new user interface and an object-based file system, but it was not planned to be shipped before 1994 (Cairo would never be shipped, however, although elements from the Cairo project would eventually ship in late July 1996 in Windows NT 4.0, without the object-based file system, which would later evolve into WinFS).

Simultaneously with Windows 3.1's release, IBM started shipping OS/2 2.0. Microsoft realized they were in need of an updated version of Windows that could support 32-bit applications and preemptive multitasking, but could still run on low-end hardware (Windows NT, requiring 12 MB RAM and 75 MB disk space, did not). Initially, the "Chicago" team did not know how the product would be packaged. Initial thoughts were there might be two products, MS-DOS 7, which would just be the underlying OS, an evolution of the Windows for Workgroups 3.11 kernel, with a character mode OS on top, and a fully integrated graphical Windows OS. But soon into the project, the idea of MS-DOS 7 was abandoned and the decision was made to develop only an integrated graphical OS Windows "Chicago."

The Chicago project was led by Brad Silverberg, who, at that time, was senior vice president of the personal systems division at Microsoft. Microsoft's product plan looked as follows:

Prior to the official release, the American public was given a chance to preview Windows 95 in the Windows 95 Preview Program. For US$19.95, users were sent a set of 3.5-inch floppy diskettes that would install Windows 95 either as an upgrade to Windows 3.1x or as a fresh install on a clean computer. Users who bought into the program were also given a free preview of The Microsoft Network (MSN), the online service that Microsoft launched with Windows 95. During the preview period Microsoft established various electronic distribution points for promotional and technical documentation on Chicago including a detailed document for media reviewers describing the new system highlights. The preview versions expired in November 1995, after which the user would have to purchase their own copy of the final version of Windows 95.

Several Windows 95 betas were released before the final launch:

References 

Windows 95